Eagle Bay is a designated place located on the Shuswap Highland Peninsula on the southern shore of Shuswap Lake in British Columbia, Canada.

Location and Nearby Settlements

The community is situated across the lake from Crowfoot Mountain on the southern shore of Shuswap Lake. Access to Eagle Bay from Sorrento is via Blind Bay Road and Eagle Bay Road or via the Trans-Canada Highway, Balmoral Road and Eagle Bay Rd.

The South Shuswap region, where Eagle Bay is found, includes the communities of Balmoral, Blind Bay, Carlin, Notch Hill, Skimikin, Sorrento, Sunnybrae, Tappen, White Lake, and Wild Rose Bay.

References

Populated places in the Columbia-Shuswap Regional District
Shuswap Country
Unincorporated settlements in British Columbia
Designated places in British Columbia